The 2019 Indian general elections held in India between 11 April and 23 April 2019 to constitute the 17th Lok Sabha.

Candidates 
Major election candidates are:

Results 
Results was announced on 23 May 2019.

Assembly segments wise lead of parties

References 

Chhattisgarh
Indian general elections in Chhattisgarh
2010s in Chhattisgarh